Echinogurges tubulatus is a species of sea snail, a marine gastropod mollusk in the family Eucyclidae.

Description
The shell grows to a height of 3.7 mm.

Distribution
This species occurs in the Atlantic Ocean off Georgia and Florida at depths between 538 m and 805 m.

References

External links
 To Biodiversity Heritage Library (1 publication)
 To Encyclopedia of Life
 To World Register of Marine Species

tubulatus
Gastropods described in 1927